Les Roises is a commune in the Meuse department in Grand Est in north-eastern France.

In 1999 it contained 40 registered inhabitants.

See also
Communes of the Meuse department

References

Roises